Minam Station is an underground station of Busan Metro Line 3 and Line 4 located in Oncheon-dong, Dongnae District, Busan.

Station Layout

Gallery

References

External links 
 Cyber station information, Line 3 from Busan Transportation Corporation 
 Cyber station information, Line 4 from Busan Transportation Corporation 

Busan Metro stations
Dongnae District
Railway stations opened in 2001
Railway stations opened in 2005